Satisfied may refer to:

Songs
"Satisfied" (Jewel song), 2010
"Satisfied" (Richard Marx song), 1989
"Satisfied" (Squeeze song), 1991
"Satisfied" (Hamilton song), a song from the musical Hamilton
"Satisfied" (Aranda song), 2012
"Satisfied", an 8stops7 song from In Moderation
"Satisfied", a CeeLo Green song from The Lady Killer
"Satisfied", a Da' T.R.U.T.H. song from Moment Of Truth
"Satisfied", an Odds song from Good Weird Feeling
"Satisfied", a Keahiwai song from Satisfied
"Satisfied", a Galantis song featuring MAX
"Satisfied", a The Buzzhorn song from Disconnected
"Satisfied", a Take That song from Take That & Party
"Satisfied", a Jordan Feliz song from Beloved

Albums
Satisfied (David Grisman and John Sebastian album), 2007
Satisfied (Taylor Dayne album), 2008
Satisfied (Rita Coolidge album), 1979
Satisfied (DecembeRadio album), 2008
Satisfied (Ashley Monroe album), 2009
Satisfied (Salt album), 2001
Satisfied (Keahiwai album), 2002